The New South Wales Residents rugby league team is a representative rugby league team consisting of players who compete in the Intrust Super Premiership (NSW Cup) competition. They currently play an annual fixture against QLD Cup Representative team, often as a curtain raiser to a State of Origin game. The team is administered by the New South Wales Rugby League and regularly played its home matches at ANZ Stadium.

History 
Since 1994, the New South Wales Residents have played an annual fixture against the Queensland Residents team, currently known as the QLD Cup Representative Team. The fixture was formerly a curtain raiser to a State of Origin game but as of 2015 has been played on the annual Representative Weekend.

Results

Results from 1994-2004 

Source:

2003

2004

2005

2006

2007

2008

2009

2010

2011

2012

2013

2014

2015

2016

2017:

2018:

2019

See also 

 New South Wales State team
 New South Wales Women's team
 New South Wales Under-20 team
 New South Wales Under-18 team
 New South Wales Under-16 team
 Intrust Super Premiership
 New South Wales Rugby League
 Country Rugby League

References 

Res
Rugby League State of Origin
Rugby league representative teams in New South Wales